Rear Admiral Michael A. Brookes (born c. 1965) is an active duty United States Navy officer and career intelligence officer who is currently serving as Director of Intelligence, J2, at U.S. Strategic Command. Prior to his current assignment, Brookes was the deputy commander, U.S. Fleet Cyber Command/U.S. 10th Fleet.

Early life and education 
Brookes is the son of a career naval officer and is a 1987 graduate of California Polytechnic State University, where he received a Bachelor of Arts in Political Science. He also holds a Master of Arts in National Security Affairs from the Naval Postgraduate School in Monterey, California. Brookes attended Navy Officer Candidate School in Newport, Rhode Island and was commissioned in March 1989.

Military career 
Brookes’ operational tours include imagery intelligence officer for the "Checkmates" of Fighter Squadron (VF) 211 embarked aboard ; assistant intelligence officer (N21) for Cruiser-Destroyer Group 1, embarked aboard ; assistant chief of staff for intelligence (N2) for Carrier Strike Group 7, embarked aboard ; deputy director of intelligence (DJ2) for Joint Special Operations Command, where he deployed to Bagram, Afghanistan as director of intelligence (J2) for a joint special operations task force; and information warfare commander for Carrier Strike Group One, embarked aboard .

Ashore, Brookes served as international programs officer for N2 Directorate, U.S. Pacific Fleet; officer-in-charge (OIC), Maritime Watch, Joint Forces Intelligence Command; intelligence operations and plans officer, Naval Special Warfare Command, where he augmented a joint special operations task force in Kabul, Afghanistan; and Deputy Director of Intelligence (DDI), National Joint Operations Intelligence Center (NJOIC) for the Joint Chiefs of Staff.

Brookes commanded the Joint Intelligence Center Central, U.S. Central Command, Tampa, Florida, and Kennedy Irregular Warfare Center, Suitland, Maryland. Prior to his current assignment, Brookes was the deputy commander, U.S. Fleet Cyber Command/U.S. 10th Fleet.

References 

1960s births
Year of birth uncertain
Living people
United States Navy officers
California Polytechnic State University alumni
Naval Postgraduate School alumni